15 and 16 Fossgate is a historic building in the city centre of York, in England.

The building was constructed as a house, in about 1600.  It is timber framed and both of the upper floors are jettied to the Fossgate front.  It was originally just one room deep, with a staircase behind, but in the late 17th century, a brick wing was added at the rear.  This has a times served as a separate tenement, known as "Morrell Yard".  They are accessed through a passage on the left side of the ground floor, which has a door with a late-17th century hood.  Inside the building, some timber framing is visible on the ground floor, and there is a rebuilt brick fireplace.

The building was grade II listed in 1954.  It currently houses a shop.

References

Fossgate
Fossgate 15
Timber framed buildings in Yorkshire